Martin Dominik Häner (born 27 August 1988) is a German former field hockey player who played as a defender or midfielder for the German national team.

Career
Häner made his debut for the German national team in 2005. At the 2012 Summer Olympics, he competed for the national team in the men's tournament, where they won the gold medal and the 2016 Olympics where Germany won bronze. On 28 May 2021, he was named in the squad for the 2021 EuroHockey Championship and the 2020 Summer Olympics. He scored four goals in the tournament as they won the silver medal after they lost the final to the Netherlands after a shoot-out. After the 2020 Summer Olympics he retired from playing hockey.

References

External links

1988 births
Living people
German male field hockey players
Male field hockey defenders
Male field hockey midfielders
2010 Men's Hockey World Cup players
Field hockey players at the 2012 Summer Olympics
2014 Men's Hockey World Cup players
Field hockey players at the 2016 Summer Olympics
Field hockey players at the 2020 Summer Olympics
2018 Men's Hockey World Cup players
Olympic field hockey players of Germany
Olympic gold medalists for Germany
Olympic bronze medalists for Germany
Olympic medalists in field hockey
Medalists at the 2012 Summer Olympics
Medalists at the 2016 Summer Olympics
Field hockey players from Berlin
East Grinstead Hockey Club players
Men's England Hockey League players
Expatriate field hockey players
German expatriate sportspeople in England
Men's Feldhockey Bundesliga players
21st-century German people

2018 FIH Indoor Hockey World Cup players